The 1988–89 Oregon State Beavers men's basketball team represented Oregon State University in Corvallis, Oregon, during the 1988–89 season.

Led by Ralph Miller, in his 19th and final season at Oregon State, and team leader Gary Payton, the Beavers would finish with a record of 22–8 (13–5 Pac-10). The Beavers were invited to the NCAA tournament, where they lost in overtime in the first round to the Evansville Purple Aces.

Roster

Schedule and results

|-
!colspan=12 style=| Non-conference regular season

|-
!colspan=12 style=| Pac-10 regular season

|-
!colspan=12 style=| Non-conference regular season

|-
!colspan=12 style=| Pac-10 regular season

|-
!colspan=12 style=| Pac-10 Tournament

|-
!colspan=12 style=| NCAA Tournament

Sources

Awards and honors
Gary Payton – AP All-American (Honorable Mention)
Ralph Miller – co-Pac-10 Coach of the Year

References

Oregon State
Oregon State Beavers men's basketball seasons
Oregon State
Oregon State
Oregon State